Arkansas Highway 313 is a north–south state highway in Lafayette County. The route runs  from Arkansas Highway 53 north to Arkansas Highway 29 in Lewisville. The route does not intersect any other state highways.

Route description
Arkansas Highway 313 begins at Arkansas Highway 53 at Mars Hill, an unincorporated community. The route runs north into Lewisville, the county seat of Lafayette County.

The road is a two–lane road for its entire length.

History
The route was designated a state highway by the Arkansas State Highway Commission on June 23, 1965. The highway follows the original routing.

Major intersections

See also

 List of state highways in Arkansas

References

External links

313
Transportation in Lafayette County, Arkansas